Mocho Nacional is a beef cattle breed created in Brazil during the 20th century. It is  polled; Mocho Nacional  means "national polled" in Portuguese. Like the Caracu, it is a European-origin breed,  not Zebu. In Brazil, this breed represents less than 2% of beef cattle. Even with low popularity, it is one of the sources of the Tabapuan, another polled beef cattle breed of Brazil.

References

 Photo
 Resumen

Beef cattle breeds
Cattle breeds originating in Brazil
Cattle breeds